Stephen P. Jaksa is an American college baseball coach and former pitcher. Jaksa is the head baseball coach at Saginaw Valley State University. He played college baseball at Central Michigan University from 1974 to 1979 for head coach Dave Keilitz. He was the head baseball coach at Northwood University in 1998 and at Central Michigan from 2002 to 2019.

Playing career
Jaksa graduated from Grand Blanc High School in Grand Blanc, Michigan. Jaksa then played college baseball at Central Michigan University from 1974 to 1979.

Coaching career
Jaksa was an assistant at Miami University in 1986 while he was working on his master's degree. He then spent the next 11 years as the head baseball coach at Nouvel Catholic Central High School, where he won two state championships in 1990 and 1997. Jaksa became the head coach at Northwood University in 1998, and guided the team to a 28–25 record. The following year, he became an assistant for Judd Folske at Central Michigan. In the summer of 2002, Jaksa was promoted to head coach. Jaksa guided the Chippewas to 500 wins, and was twice named the Mid-American Conference Coach of the Year. (2004 and 2015). On June 2, 2018, Jaksa retired from Central Michigan as the program's 2nd most winning head coach. Just two months after his retirement, he was named the head baseball coach at Saginaw Valley State University.

Head coaching record

References

External links
Central Michigan Chippewas bio
Saginaw Valley State Cardinals bio

Living people
Year of birth missing (living people)
Baseball pitchers
Central Michigan Chippewas baseball players
Miami RedHawks baseball coaches
High school baseball coaches in the United States
Northwood Timberwolves baseball coaches
Central Michigan Chippewas baseball coaches
Saginaw Valley State Cardinals baseball coaches